The Eastern Sudan States Coordinating Council is a body established by the Eastern Sudan Peace Agreement signed by the Government of Sudan and the rebel  Eastern Front in June 2006. It seeks to enhance cooperation between the three eastern states of the Republic of Sudan; Kassala, Red Sea and Al Qadarif. The agreement also established an Eastern Sudan Reconstruction and Development Fund to aid wealth-sharing between the central government and the three states. It requires the President of Sudan to appoint one Assistant to the President from nominees presented by the Eastern Front.

Composition of the council

The council is composed of the following 15 members:

 The Governor of Kassala
 The Governor of Red Sea
 The Governor of Al Qadarif
 The Speaker of the Assembly of Kassala
 The Speaker of the Assembly of Red Sea
 The Speaker of the Assembly of Al Qadarif
 Three representatives of the Eastern Front
 Six representatives from other political groups

The three state Governors chair the proceedings of the council on a rotational basis.

Power-sharing principles of the Eastern Sudan Peace Agreement

In addition to the establishment of the Eastern Sudan States Coordinating Council and the Eastern Sudan Reconstruction and Development Fund, the peace agreement also allocated the following political positions to East Sudanese people:

Federal level
 One Assistant to the President
 One advisor to the President of Sudan
 Two Cabinet Ministers and two State Ministers
 Eignt seats of the National Assembly shall be allocated to the Eastern Front

State level
 The Deputy-Governor of Kassala shall be nominated by the Eastern Front
 The Deputy-Governor of Al Qadarif shall be nominated by the Eastern Front
 One Minister in the executive of Red Sea state
 Ten seats in the legislative assemblies of each of the three states

References

Government agencies of Sudan
Politics of Sudan